Huayllabamba may refer to:

 Huayllabamba, Urubamba
 Huayllabamba District, Urubamba
 Huayllabamba, Sihuas
 Huayllabamba District, Sihuas

See also 
 Huayllapampa District